Jason Morgan is a politician who represents the 23rd District in the Michigan House of Representatives. He previously served as a Washtenaw County commissioner representing the board's 8th district.  He is a member of the Democratic Party.

Early life and education 
Morgan was born and raised in Pinconning, Michigan. He graduated from Northern Michigan University in 2011 with a bachelor's degree in Political Science. He moved to Ann Arbor in 2011. He later received a Master of Public Administration from the Ford School of Public Policy at the University of Michigan.

Career 
During his career in politics, Morgan has served as an advisor to Congresswoman Haley Stevens, Constituent Services Director for Michigan Secretary of State Jocelyn Benson, Transition Director for Congresswoman Elissa Slotkin, and as the District Director for Congresswoman Debbie Dingell.

In 2021, Morgan was appointed to the Northern Michigan University Board of Trustees by Governor Gretchen Whitmer for an eight-year term. In 2023, Morgan resigned from the Board of Trustees after he was elected to the state legislature. 

Morgan is a part-time instructor at Washtenaw Community College.
 
Morgan is a member of the U.S. Coast Guard Auxiliary.

In February 2023, Morgan was selected to serve as the first vice chair of the Michigan Democratic Party.

Washtenaw County commissioner 
Morgan was elected to the Washtenaw County Board of Commissioners' 8th district seat in 2016. He chaired the board from 2019 to 2021 and was re-elected to the board in 2018 and 2020. Morgan served as the first openly LGBTQ chair of the commission.

2022 election and first State House term 
In June 2021, Morgan announced his candidacy for representative for Michigan's 53rd district. He received endorsements from a large number of local elected officials, including Ann Arbor Mayor Christopher Taylor and State Representative Felicia Brabec. On August 2, 2022, Morgan advanced from the Democratic primary. On November 8, 2022, Morgan was elected to serve represent the  23rd District in the Michigan House of Representatives, defeating his Republican opponent with over 65% of the vote.

In 2023, Morgan was appointed to serve as the chair of the Military, Veterans and State Police Committee, and as the Vice Chair of Education and Transportation Appropriations Subcommittees.

Personal life 
At age 13, Morgan was diagnosed with Becker's Muscular Dystrophy. 

In July 2022, Morgan became engaged to his partner, Jon.

Electoral history

2022

References 

1989 births
Living people
People from Ann Arbor, Michigan
Politicians from Ann Arbor, Michigan
County commissioners in Michigan
Michigan Democrats
Northern Michigan University alumni
Gerald R. Ford School of Public Policy alumni
People from Pinconning, Michigan
LGBT state legislators in Michigan
21st-century American politicians
Democratic Party members of the Michigan House of Representatives